Benjamin Garfield (4 April 1871 – mid-1958) was an English footballer who played at outside left. Garfield played for Finedon, Kettering Town, Burton Wanderers, West Bromwich Albion, Brighton & Hove Albion, Tunbridge Wells Rangers and England.

Biography 
Garfield was born in Higham Ferrers, Northamptonshire. In 1898 he won his only England cap, appearing in a 3–2 victory over Ireland in Belfast.

References

External links

1871 births
1958 deaths
People from Higham Ferrers
English footballers
England international footballers
Association football outside forwards
Kettering Town F.C. players
Burton Wanderers F.C. players
West Bromwich Albion F.C. players
Brighton & Hove Albion F.C. players
Tunbridge Wells F.C. players
English Football League players
Southern Football League players